The Boston College–Harvard men's basketball rivalry is an American college basketball rivalry between the Boston College Eagles basketball team of Boston College and Harvard Crimson basketball team of Harvard College. The two teams' geographical proximity has made the rivalry an intense one.

History

After many years of domination by Boston College, Harvard, led by coach Tommy Amaker, won every game it played against Boston College from 2008 to 2014. The 2008–09 Harvard team defeated No. 17 Boston College on January 7, 2009 for the first win over a ranked team in the program's history. The 2008–09 recruiting class was the first time an Ivy League institution was ranked in the top 25 by ESPN. Despite this, the Eagles still hold the overall advantage in the rivalry.

Results

References

College basketball rivalries in the United States
Boston College Eagles men's basketball
Harvard Crimson men's basketball